Symmes can refer to:

People
 John Cleves Symmes, colonel in the Continental Army and New Jersey representative at the Continental Congress
 John Cleves Symmes, Jr., originator of the Hollow Earth theory
 Zechariah Symmes, Puritan minister in colonial Charlestown, Massachusetts

Places
 Symmes Creek in southeastern Ohio
 Symmes Mission Chapel in Fairfield, Ohio
 Symmes Purchase in southwestern Ohio
 Symmes Township, Edgar County, Illinois
 Symmes Township, Hamilton County, Ohio
 Symmes Township, Lawrence County, Ohio
 Symmes Valley High School in Willow Wood, Ohio